Tales from the Twilight World is the third studio album by German power metal band Blind Guardian, released on 2 October 1990.

Track listing 

a.

Lyrical references 

 "Traveler in Time" is based on Frank Herbert's Dune
 "Welcome to Dying" is based on Peter Straub's Floating Dragon
 "Lord of the Rings" is based on J. R. R. Tolkien's The Lord of the Rings
 "Tommyknockers" and "Altair 4" are based on Stephen King's The Tommyknockers
 "Goodbye My Friend" is inspired by the film E.T.
 "Lost in the Twilight Hall" is about the time spent "between worlds" by the wizard Gandalf the Grey after defeating the Balrog of Moria before his reincarnation as Gandalf the White.
 "The Last Candle" talks about places and events of Margaret Weis and Tracy Hickman's Dragonlance universe, specially from the "Chronicles" and "Legends" trilogies.

Personnel
Blind Guardian
 Hansi Kürsch – vocals, bass
 André Olbrich – lead guitar, backing vocals
 Marcus Siepen – rhythm guitar, backing vocals
 Thomas "Thomen" Stauch – drums

Guest appearances
 Kai Hansen (Iron Savior, Helloween, Gamma Ray) – backing vocals, vocals on "Lost in the Twilight Hall", guitar solo on "The Last Candle"
 Piet Sielck (Iron Savior, Savage Circus) – backing vocals, effects
 Mathias Wiesner – effects, keyboards
 Rolf Köhler, "Hacky" Hackmann and Kalle Trapp – backing vocals

Production
 Kalle Trapp – production, mixing, recording
 Piet Sielck – second engineer
 Charley Rinne – executive producer
 Andreas Marshall – cover paintings and idea
 Buffo/Charley Rinne – pictures

Charts

References

Tales from the Twilight World (Blind Guardian)
Blind Guardian albums